The House Order of Henry the Lion In German: Hausorden Heinrichs des Löwen, was the House Order of the Duchy of Brunswick. It was instituted by William VIII, Duke of Brunswick on 25 April 1834.
The ribbon of the Order was red with yellow edges. It had five grades: Grand Cross, Grand Commander with Sash, Commander, Knight 1st Class, Knight 2nd Class, plus Medal of Merit for Science and Arts, the Cross of Merit and the Medal of Honour. The Order was named in honour of Henry the Lion, who remains a popular figure to this day.

Order Grades 
When the Order was founded in 1834 it was originally established with just four main classes and also an affiliated Cross of Merit: 
 Grand Cross
 Commander 1st class
 Commander 2nd class
 Knight
 Cross of Merit 1st and 2nd class

When the Franco-Prussian War broke out in 1870, swords were introduced to all classes so the order could also act as an award for  war merit. These swords were attached under the bottom arm of the blue cross, and on the breast star on grades this was applicable. On March 8, 1877, the Duke decreed that the knights class would be divided into first and second class grades. In 1903 the form order used to set up a silver medal that was also attached to the order. In 1908 a first class was introduced. There was also the officer's cross, as well as a fourth class added and the badge of honour divided into two classes - silver and bronze - from this point on. One year later there were changes regarding the awarding of swords. This was now awarded for war merit crossing the center shield, and in addition, the swords were introduced over the cross. Awards were made to holders of a higher class if they had already been awarded a lower class with swords for war merit. Until the end of the monarchy in November 1918, the medal was awarded in the following order of precedence: 
 Grand Cross (with collar)
 Grand Cross 1st Class
 Commander 1st and 2nd class
 Officer's Cross
 Knights 1st and 2nd class
 Cross of Merit 1st and 2nd class
 Badges of honour 1st and 2nd class

Insignia design 

The badge of the order is a golden, four-armed eight-pointed, light blue enamelled St. John's Cross with a red, blasted central shield on which the crowned column with the jumping Saxon steed and on the wings of the helmet and the peacock feathers of the coat of arms are attached.

A lion connects the crown and cross, between the wings there are crowned “W” for the founder of the order Duke Wilhelm. The motto IMMOTA FIDES (unshakable loyalty) is written on the lapel of the middle shield with the foundation's Roman date MDCCCXXXIV all around.

In contrast to all other classes, the cross of the knights II class is made of silver. The fourth class is also made of silver and is only enamelled in the central medallion.

The Cross of Merit of both classes is a high cross with a medallion attached and the crowned initial of the founder "W" can be seen in it. On the arms of the cross is the motto of the order: IM / MO / TA / FIDES. A green enamelled oak wreath also runs between the cross arms of the 1st class .

The badge of honour is a round medal, with the first class in silver and the second class in bronze. In the obverse is the founders "W" initial, enclosed by a wreath of oak leaves and surmounted by a crown. On the reverse the two-line order motto already described, and above it is a six-pointed star while below are two crossed oak branches.

The breast star of the Grand Cross was a silver eight-pointed star with a stylised version of the blue enamelled cross with a central red medallion bearing the orders motto, and a crowned gold "W" in the very centre. The breast star for the Grand Commander is different, made up of a silver representation of the orders badge, with four golden crowned "W"s between each of the four arms. The central medallion is a made up of a red enamelled disk featuring the orders motto in gold, surrounded by a golden wreath.

Wearing method 

The Grand Cross class was carried on a red and yellow sash, worn from the left shoulder and worn with the Grand Cross breast star. On special occasions the badge of the order could also be worn from the collar of the order. The collar was a special class of the Grand Cross and it is not clear if everyone awarded the Grand Cross also received the collar. 

The Grand Commander class was also worn on a sash like the Grand Cross, but a different style, but also sometimes on a neck ribbon like the commander class. This grade also came with the Grand Commander class breast star, which was different in design from that of the Grand Cross. 

The Commander II class was worn, suspended from a ribbon around the neck and did not come with a breast star. 

The officer's cross is a plug-in cross which, like the rest of the classes of the order, was worn on the left side of the chest.

The knights class is worn on a ribbon attached to the left side of the chest. 

All versions of the decoration are carried on a crimson ribbon with yellow edges in different sizes according to the relevant classes.

Recipients 

The following award numbers can be determined from the registration lists of the Lower Saxony State Archives: 

Four copies of the Grand Cross were made, studded with diamonds were awarded for exceptionally special merits. The first was made in 1835 for 1,200 guilders, the second in 1837 for 963 pounds, and the third and fourth for 7,000 gold marks each.

Known recipients

 see: Bearer of the Order of Henry the Lion

 Duke Adolf Friedrich of Mecklenburg
 Adolphus Frederick V, Grand Duke of Mecklenburg-Strelitz
 Prince Albert of Prussia (1809–1872)
 Prince Albert of Prussia (1837–1906)
 Prince Aribert of Anhalt
 Prince Arthur, Duke of Connaught and Strathearn
 Prince August of Württemberg
 Prince Augustus of Prussia
 Prince Bernhard of Saxe-Weimar-Eisenach (1792–1862)
 Theobald von Bethmann Hollweg
 Otto von Bismarck
 Bernhard von Bülow
 Charles Alexander, Grand Duke of Saxe-Weimar-Eisenach
 Charles Augustus, Hereditary Grand Duke of Saxe-Weimar-Eisenach (1844–1894)
 Chulalongkorn
 Constantine I of Greece
 Eduard, Duke of Anhalt
 Ernest Augustus, Duke of Brunswick
 Prince Ernest Augustus, 3rd Duke of Cumberland and Teviotdale
 Ernest Louis, Grand Duke of Hesse
 Ernst I, Duke of Saxe-Altenburg
 Ernst II, Duke of Saxe-Altenburg
 Franz Joseph I of Austria
 Frederick II, Grand Duke of Baden
 Frederick Augustus II, Grand Duke of Oldenburg
 Frederick Francis II, Grand Duke of Mecklenburg-Schwerin
 Frederick I, Duke of Anhalt
 Frederick III, German Emperor
 Frederick William IV of Prussia
 Frederick William, Grand Duke of Mecklenburg-Strelitz
 Prince Friedrich of Saxe-Meiningen
 Prince Friedrich Leopold of Prussia
 Georg, Prince of Schaumburg-Lippe
 George I of Greece
 George V of Hanover
 George, King of Saxony
 Erich von Gündell
 Günther Victor, Prince of Schwarzburg
 Gustav, Prince of Vasa
 Wilhelm von Hahnke
 Dietrich von Hülsen-Haeseler
 Duke John Albert of Mecklenburg
 Prince Julius of Schleswig-Holstein-Sonderburg-Glücksburg
 Archduke Karl Ludwig of Austria
 Grand Duke Kirill Vladimirovich of Russia
 Maximilian von Laffert
 Fritz von Loßberg
 Louis IV, Grand Duke of Hesse
 Archduke Ludwig Viktor of Austria
 Luitpold, Prince Regent of Bavaria
 Edwin Freiherr von Manteuffel
 Duke William of Mecklenburg-Schwerin
 Emperor Meiji
 Klemens von Metternich
 Milan I of Serbia
 Helmuth von Moltke the Elder
 Prince Moritz of Saxe-Altenburg
 August Ludwig von Nostitz
 Duke Philipp of Württemberg
 Philipp, Prince of Eulenburg
 Hans von Plessen
 Prince Friedrich Wilhelm of Prussia
 Rupprecht, Crown Prince of Bavaria
 Prince William of Schaumburg-Lippe
 Eberhard Graf von Schmettow
 Archduke Stephen of Austria (Palatine of Hungary)
 Otto Graf zu Stolberg-Wernigerode
 Alfred von Tirpitz
 Prince Valdemar of Denmark
 Alfred von Waldersee
 Wilhelm II, German Emperor
 William I of Württemberg
 William I, German Emperor
 William II of Württemberg
 William Ernest, Grand Duke of Saxe-Weimar-Eisenach
 William IV, Grand Duke of Luxembourg
 Duke William of Württemberg
 William, Duke of Brunswick
 William, Prince of Hohenzollern
 Friedrich Graf von Wrangel

Gallery

References

See also
Henry the Lion

1834 establishments in Germany
Orders, decorations, and medals of the Duchy of Brunswick
19th-century establishments in the Duchy of Brunswick
Awards established in 1834